In political science, economic voting is a theoretical perspective which argues that voter behavior is heavily influenced by the economic conditions in their country at the time of the election. According to the classical form of this perspective, voters tend to vote more in favor of the incumbent candidate and party when the economy is doing well than when it is doing poorly. This view has been supported by considerable empirical evidence. There is a substantial literature which shows that across the world's democracies, economic conditions shape electoral outcomes. Economic voting is less likely when it is harder for voters to attribute economic performance to specific parties and candidates.

Research on economic voting combines the disciplines of political science and economics using econometric techniques. Economic voting has been divided into several categories, including pocketbook voting (based on individual concerns) versus sociotropic voting (based on the economy at large), as well as retrospective voting (based on previous economic trends) versus prospective voting (based on expected future economic trends). Research conducted in the United States has indicated that, in presidential elections, American voters tend to be sociotropic and retrospective. However, when the incumbent candidate in a United States presidential election is not running, economic voter choice tends to be overwhelmingly prospective. One of the most prominent expressions of the economic voting perspective came when James Carville, the chief strategist for Bill Clinton's 1992 presidential campaign, placed a sign in the campaign office reading "It's the economy, stupid!". Research shows in the United States that voters punish the president's party in presidential, Senate, House, gubernatorial and state legislative elections when the local economy is doing poorly.

There is empirical evidence to show that  in India a positive relationship between economic growth and overall re-election prospects exists, that is, economy matters for the election results in India.  While Gupta and Panagariya (2014) and Vaishnav and Swanson (2015) examine the correlation in the 2000s,  Chanchal Kumar Sharma and Wilfried Swenden (2019) examine and establish a more durable connection between economic governance and party system change in India. The economic governance theory proposed by Chanchal Kumar Sharma & Wilfried Swenden suggests that voters largely held national incumbents responsible for economic success or failure under the command-economy paradigm, but state incumbents under the market economy paradigm. As free-market reforms empowered the states to develop their own economic and social policies, subnational and not national political incumbents, often representing regional or state parties, were increasingly held responsible for changes in the economic life of the states they governed. The salience of economic issues (especially unemployment and lack of overall development during the state incumbents' term in office) in post 2019 assembly elections in Haryana and Maharashtra vindicates Sharma-Swenden thesis. 

A 2021 study found that evidence of economic voting in all U.S. presidential elections, all the way back to George Washington.

References

Voting theory
Econometrics